Juraj Prokop (born 18 September 1985) is a Slovak professional ice hockey player who played with HC Slovan Bratislava in the Slovak Extraliga.

References

Living people
HC Slovan Bratislava players
Slovak ice hockey right wingers
1985 births
Ice hockey people from Bratislava
HC Prešov players
Medicine Hat Tigers players
HK Trnava players
ŠHK 37 Piešťany players
HK 36 Skalica players
Slovak expatriate ice hockey players in Canada
Slovak expatriate ice hockey players in the Czech Republic
Slovak expatriate sportspeople in Spain
Expatriate ice hockey players in Spain